Edwin John Feulner Jr. (born August 12, 1941) is a former think tank executive who founded the conservative think tank The Heritage Foundation and served as its president from 1977 to 2013 and again from 2017 to 2018. Feulner's positions have included advisor and chairman of the Victims of Communism Memorial Foundation, from which he received the Truman-Reagan Medal of Freedom in 2006.

Early years and education
Edwin John Feulner Jr. was born in Chicago, Illinois, to Helen Joan (née Franzen) and Edwin John Feulner, the owner of a Chicago real estate firm. He has three sisters: Mary Ann, Joan, and Barbara. The family comes from a line of devout Roman Catholic German Americans. Three of his maternal uncles were parish priests. Feulner attended Immaculate Conception High School (Elmhurst, Illinois) and graduated from Regis University with a bachelor's degree in English in 1963.

After receiving an MBA from the University of Pennsylvania's Wharton School of Business in 1964, he attended Georgetown University and the London School of Economics, where he was a Richard M. Weaver Fellow. He put his studies on hold while President of The Heritage Foundation. Later, in 1981 he earned a PhD in political science at the University of Edinburgh presenting the thesis 'The evolution of the Republican Study Committee'.

Career
Feulner began his career as an analyst for the Center for Strategic and International Studies, then called the Center for Strategic Studies. He later became a congressional aide to Congressman Melvin Laird. Feulner subsequently became a long-serving executive assistant to Illinois Republican congressman Phil Crane. Prior to his presidency of the Heritage Foundation, Feulner was executive director of the Republican Study Committee.

Heritage Foundation
Feulner was a founding trustee of the Heritage Foundation from 1973 until 1977, when he left Representative Crane's office to run the outfit full-time. It had nine employees and in those four years had churned through four presidents. As president, he changed the foundation's direction. He wanted it to be more aggressive, more market-driven and less ivory-tower, creating easily-accessed, concise studies. By focusing the foundation's marketing, he transformed it from a small operation into a booming enterprise of conservative ideals, eventually creating the think tank that Newt Gingrich, in a New York Times column, called "the Parthenon of the conservative metropolis."

This new marketing strategy was called the "briefcase test", a concept that revolutionized the influence of think tanks on public policy and boosted Heritage's popularity. Now the focus was on easily accessed, timely, concise research that could fit in a briefcase. A further fillip was the foundation's publishing of policy reports and papers ahead of related legislation, rather than the established think-tank practice of waiting until it had been passed. As Feulner related to The Washington Examiner, "It doesn't do us any good to have great ideas if we are not out there peddling our products."

Within a year and a half of Feulner becoming president, Heritage's budget had increased to $2.5 million with a donor pool of about 120,000. The institution has around 250 employees and annual income of about $80 million and a donor pool of about 600,000.

In January 2013, Feulner published the column "Economic Freedom on the Wane" to review the results of the annual Index of Economic Freedom, which has been an ongoing joint project of The Wall Street Journal and Heritage Foundation since 1995. The index measures individual countries' policies in the broad areas of rule of law, limited government, regulatory efficiency, and open markets.

Retiring as chair of the foundation in 2013, Feulner briefly resumed the role in 2017 following the election of Donald Trump.

Other roles
Feulner was president and treasurer of the Mont Pelerin Society in 2014. He has served as a trustee and as the chairman of the board of the Intercollegiate Studies Institute. He has also been a member of the board of the National Chamber Foundation and of the Institut d'Etudes Politiques, as well as of the board of trustees and a life trustee of Regis University, his undergraduate alma mater. He became a member of the advisory council of the Victims of Communism Memorial Foundation, and held its chair in 2021.

Among other executive and advisory roles, Feulner was president of the Philadelphia Society 1982–1983 and 2013–2014, and is a past director of  the Council for National Policy, the Acton Institute, and George Mason University. Feulner served as a member of the Gingrich–Mitchell Congressional UN Reform Task Force (2005) and of the Meltzer Commission from 1999–2000. He was vice chairman of the National Commission on Economic Growth and Tax Reform, known as the Kemp Commission, from 1995 to 1996. He also was the chairman of the U.S. Advisory Commission on Public Diplomacy (1982–91), a consultant for domestic policy to U.S. president Ronald Reagan, and an adviser to several government departments and agencies.

Awards and distinctions
In 1989 Feulner received the Presidential Citizens Medal, the second-highest civilian award in the United States.

He is frequently recognized by media and in conservative circles as an influence in US right-wing policy thought. In Forbes Magazine, in 2009, Karl Rove called Feulner the sixth most powerful conservative in Washington. In 2007 GQ magazine considered him one of the "50 most powerful people in D.C." In both 2007 and 2010, the UK's Daily Telegraph named him "one of the 100 most influential conservatives in America".

In June 2012, Feulner received the conservative Bradley Prize for "extraordinary talent and dedication". In 2018, he took the National Review's William F. Buckley Jr. Prize for Leadership in Political Thought.

He has been awarded eleven honorary degrees, and has received honors from the governments of Taiwan, South Korea and the Czech Republic.

Personal life

Feulner and his wife, Linda Claire Leventhal, live in Alexandria, Virginia. They have two children.

Bibliography
 Looking Back (Heritage Foundation, 1981). , 
 Conservatives Stalk the House (Green Hill, 1983). 
 The March of Freedom (Spence Publishing Company, 1998). 
 Intellectual Pilgrims (Mont Pelerin Society, 1999). 
 Leadership for America: The Principles of Conservatism (Spence Publishing Company, 2000). 
 Getting America Right (Co-author Doug Wilson) (Crown Forum, 2006). 
 The American Spirit (Co-author Brian Tracy) (Thomas Nelson, 2012). 
 "Economic Freedom on the Wane", Townhall.com, January 19, 2013

References

External links
 "Heritage Foundation launches Feulner Institute
 Getting America Right Official website
 
 A Lesson in Conservative Optimism, The Weekend Interview by Daniel Henninger, The Wall Street Journal, December 7, 2012
 with Ed Feulner by Stephen McKiernan, Binghamton University Libraries Center for the Study of the 1960s, August 7, 2003

1941 births
Living people
Alumni of the University of Edinburgh
Alumni of the London School of Economics
Georgetown University alumni
The Heritage Foundation
Writers from Chicago
Roman Catholic activists
Wharton School of the University of Pennsylvania alumni
American people of German descent
American political writers
American male non-fiction writers
Regis University alumni
Presidential Citizens Medal recipients
Illinois Republicans
Virginia Republicans